Crepidomanes is a genus of ferns in the family Hymenophyllaceae. It is mostly distributed through the old world but has one species Crepidomanes intricatum in North America. The genus includes the following taxa according to Ebihara et al. 2006.

Species
Subgenus Nesopteris
Crepidomanes aphlebioides  (H. Christ) I.M. Turner
Crepidomanes intermedium  (Bosch) Ebihara & K. Iwats.
Crepidomanes thysanostomum  (Makino) Ebihara & K. Iwats.
Crepidomanes grande  (Copel.) Ebihara & K. Iwats.
Subgenus Crepidomanes
Section Cladotrichoma
Crepidomanes frappieri  (Cordem.) J.P. Roux
Crepidomanes longilabiatum  (Bonaparte) J.P. Roux
Section Crepidium
Crepidomanes humile  (G. Forst.) Bosch.
Crepidomanes minutum  (Blume) K. Iwats
Section Crepidomanes
Crepidomanes africanum  (H. Christ) Ebihara & Dubuisson
Crepidomanes mettenii  (C. Chr.) Ebihara & Dubuisson
Crepidomanes barnardianum  (F.M. Bailey) Tindale
Crepidomanes bipunctatum  (Poir.) Copel.
Crepidomanes chevalieri  (H. Christ) Ebihara & Dubuisson
Crepidomanes christii  (Copel.) Copel.
Crepidomanes clarenceanum  (F. Ballard) Pic.Serm
Crepidomanes draytonianum  (Brack.) Ebihara & K. Iwats.
Crepidomanes fallax  (H. Christ) Ebihara & Dubuisson
Crepidomanes intricatum  (Farrar) Ebihara & Weakley
Crepidomanes inopinatum  (Pic.Serm.) J.P. Roux
Crepidomanes intramarginale  (Hook. & Grev.) Copel.
Crepidomanes kurzii  (Bedd.) Tagawa & K. Iwats.
Crepidomanes latealatum  (Bosch) Copel.
Crepidomanes latemarginale  (D.C. Eaton) Copel.
Crepidomanes melanotrichum  (Schltdl.) J.P. Roux
Crepidomanes rupicolum  (Racib.) Copel.
Crepidomanes schmidtianum  (Zenker ex Taschner) K. Iwats.
Crepidomanes vitiense  (Baker) Bostock.

Phylogeny
Phylogeny of Crepidomanes by Fern Tree of Life.

References

Hymenophyllales
Ferns of the Americas
Ferns of Oceania
Fern genera
Taxa named by Carl Borivoj Presl